Mount St. Mary's Mountaineers head coach Tom Gravante was assisted by coaches Kevin Giblin, Nick Kellinger, and Ted Moon. Jared McMahon, Connor McMahon, Kadin Kightlinger, and Noah Daniels served as team captains. 2021 team leaders Luke Frankeny, Bryan McIntosh, and Sam Stephen transferred to other programs prior to the season.

The Mountaineers registered their first win over Navy in program history with the season opener. Goalie Griffin McGinley earned USA Lacrosse Player of the Week, NEC Defensive Player of the Week, and Lacrosse Bucket Team of the Week honors, while attackman Cormac Giblin earned NEC Player of the Week honors. Senior goalie Gunnar Luckoski earned NEC Defensive Player of the Week honors, and was named an NEC Prime Performer along with sophomore face off specialist Connor Beals and graduate attackman Brendan Lantieri after the Mount's 9-5 win over Wagner College. With a 5-10 regular season record, Mount St. Mary's failed to qualify for the NEC playoffs.

At the conclusion of the season, captain Noah Daniels earned United States Intercollegiate Lacrosse Association's Scholar All-American honors, and assistant coach Kevin Giblin was inducted into the National Interscholastic Lacrosse Coaches Association Hall of Fame.

Roster 

† = Inactive Due to Injury

Transfers

Schedule 

Pairings: SC = Scrimmage; NC = Non-conference; NEC = Conference; CT = Conference Tournament

References 

Mount St. Mary's
Mount St. Mary's Mountaineers men's lacrosse